The Alfa Romeo Visconti is a concept car made by the Italian car manufacturer Alfa Romeo, designed by Giorgetto Giugiaro.
The car was seen for the first time at the Geneva Motor Show in 2004.

The car is front-engined all-wheel-drive assisted with rear-wheel steering, with a six-speed automatic gearbox and Brembo's composite ceramic brake discs all-round.

The name Visconti comes from old Milanese family ancestry. Their coat of arms, a snake devouring a child, is part of the logo of Alfa Romeo.

References 

Visconti
Italdesign concept vehicles
Cars introduced in 2004
All-wheel-drive vehicles
Coupés
Sports sedans